L'ultima Burba (translates as The Last Rookie) is a comic strip series written by Leo Ortolani during the years preceding his public acclamation as comics author.

It tells, through a series of humorous incidents, the adventures of the young Leonardo Ortolani as he confronts the difficulties of military service, his comrades in arms, the loathsome experiences of working in the kitchen or at the typewriter.

L'ultima Burba was published in its entirety in the form of single strips in the first 40 issues of the Rat-Man Collection.

Italian comics titles